Jobabo is a municipality and town in the Las Tunas Province of Cuba.

Overview
Jobabo is named from the taino word jobabol, meaning "a place where many jobo trees grow".

Demographics
In 2004, the municipality of Jobabo had a population of 49,403.

See also
Municipalities of Cuba
List of cities in Cuba

References

External links

Populated places in Las Tunas Province